Michael "Mike" E. Noel (born October 17, 1947 in Ogden, Utah) is an American politician and a Republican member of the Utah House of Representatives representing District 73 since January 1, 2003.

Early life and career
Noel earned his BA from UC Berkeley and his MS from the University of South Dakota. He began a PhD at Utah State University but did not complete it.

Noel worked for the United States Department of the Interior, Bureau of Land Management, as a Realty Specialist based in Kanab, Utah.

Political career
2002 When District 73 Republican Representative Thomas V. Hatch ran for Utah State Senate and left the seat open, Noel ran in the June 25, 2002 Republican Primary, winning with 2,863 votes (52%) and was unopposed for the November 5, 2002 General election, winning with 8,587 votes.
2004 Noel was unopposed for the June 22, 2004 Republican Primary and won the November 2, 2004 General election with 10,218 votes (88.7%) against Green candidate Victoria Woodard.
2006 Noel was unopposed for the 2006 Republican Primary and won the November 7, 2006 General election against Constitution candidate Allison Howes.
2008 Noel was unopposed for the June 24, 2008 Republican Primary and won the three-way November 4, 2008 General election with 9,199 votes (71.9%) against Democratic nominee Ted Hallisey and returning 2006 Constitution challenger Allison Howes.
2010 Noel was unopposed for both the June 22, 2010 Republican Primary and the November 2, 2010 General election, winning with 8,672 votes.
2012 Noel was unopposed for the June 26, 2012 Republican Primary and won the November 6, 2012 General election with 9,600 votes (72%) against Utah Justice Party candidate Ty Markham.
2014 Noel was unopposed for both the Republican convention and the November 4, 2014 general election.

During the 2016 legislative session, Noel served as the chair of the House Rules Committee, along with serving on the Natural Resources, Agriculture, and Environmental Quality Appropriations Subcommittee, the House Education Committee, the House Ethics Committee, the Native American Legislative Liaison Committee, and the House Natural Resources, Agriculture, and Environment Committee. During the interim, he served on the House Education Interim Committee and the Natural Resources, Agriculture, and Environment Interim Committee. Noel is also a member of the State Water Development Commission.

2016 Sponsored Legislation

Representative Noel also floor sponsored SB0258 Distribution of Local Sales Tax Revenue, SJR007 Joint Rules Resolution on Committee Bills, and SJR015 Joint Rules Resolution -- Conference Committees.

References

External links
Official page at the Utah State Legislature
Campaign site

Michael Noel at Ballotpedia
Mike Noel at the National Institute on Money in State Politics

Place of birth missing (living people)
1947 births
Living people
Republican Party members of the Utah House of Representatives
People from Kanab, Utah
Politicians from Ogden, Utah

University of California, Berkeley alumni
University of South Dakota alumni
Utah State University alumni
21st-century American politicians